The South African type KT tender was a steam locomotive tender.

The Type KT tender first entered service in 1925, as tenders to the  Big Bill  Mountain type and  Big Bertha  Pacific type steam locomotives which were acquired by the South African Railways in that year.

Manufacturers
Type KT tenders were built between 1925 and 1930 by American Locomotive Company, Baldwin Locomotive Works, Henschel and Son, Hohenzollern Locomotive Works, Società Italiana Ernesto Breda and North British Locomotive Company.

The South African Railways (SAR) placed twelve Class 15C Mountain type locomotives (reclassified to Class 15CB in 1926) and seven Class 16D Pacific type locomotives in service in 1925 and 1926. The locomotives and tender were designed by Baldwin Locomotive Works of Philadelphia. The Classes 15C and 16D were acquired specifically for the long runs of the Union Limited (Johannesburg to Cape Town) and Union Express (Cape Town to Johannesburg) passenger trains. The Type KT first entered service as tenders to these two locomotive Classes.

Characteristics

This appears to have been limitations for working on lines laid with lighter rail after the respective engines were withdrawn from mainline working, since the tenders were apparently not modified to reduce their capacities.

Locomotives
Five locomotive classes and models, built by six manufacturers, were delivered new with Type KT tenders, which were numbered for their engines in the number ranges as shown. An oval number plate, bearing the engine number and often also the tender type, was attached to the rear end of the tender. On some tenders, presumably after number plates went astray, the number was weld-written on the tender instead, as on the illustrated tender no. 2041.
 1925: Class 15CB, numbers 2060 to 2071.
 1925: Class 16D, numbers 860 to 866.
 1926: Class 15CA, numbers 2039 to 2059, 2072 to 2077 and 2801 to 2857.
 1928: Class 16DA of 1928, numbers 843 to 850 and 868 to 873.
 1930: Class 16DA of 1930, numbers 874 to 879.

Classification letters
Since many tender types are interchangeable between different locomotive classes and types, a tender classification system was adopted by the SAR. The first letter of the tender type indicates the classes of engines to which it can be coupled. The "K_" tenders could only be used with the four locomotive classes with which they were delivered.

The second letter indicates the tender's water capacity.

Modified from Type HT
After their locomotives were withdrawn from service, the Type HT tenders of the two Class 18 2-10-2 Henschel Giants had their mechanical stokers removed and their drawgear modified for use with Class 15CA locomotives. These two tenders were then redesignated Type KT as well.

References

KT